The Angitis, also known as Angista (Dramatitsa), is a river in Northern Greece. It is an important tributary of the Strymonas. 

Its source is in the Falakro mountains, in the regional unit of Drama, near the town of Prosotsani. It flows south until Fotolivos, where it turns west and enters the Serres regional unit. It flows into the Strymonas near Tragilos.

The river is the setting for a number of extreme sports, including rafting. A short distance from the cave is the gorge of the Angitis,  in length with a depth that reaches  down to the river bed.

Notes

Rivers of Greece
Landforms of Drama (regional unit)
Rivers of Eastern Macedonia and Thrace
Landforms of Serres (regional unit)
Rivers of Central Macedonia